This is the list of compositions by Alexandre Goria who wrote about 130 drawing-room pieces among polkas, berceuses, nocturnes, waltzes, rêvéries,  and his Serenade for the left hand, which became widely known during his active years. Among his 31 grand études, those in Opp. 72 and 63 were highly praised by every audience. He also wrote barcarolles, fantasies and mazurkas, and a good number of characteristic and genre pieces one quotes from memory are the beautiful Allegrezza, l'Attente, Le Calme, lighter works indeed but which have a real cachet of originality. His transcriptions of selected motifs from several operas such as Souvenires du Théâtre Italien, Belisario, Il Trovatore, Le Pardon de Ploërmel, Montenegrins, Una Furtiva Lagrima, all cleverly written, prove the great popularity of his name which had real commercial value. 

Goria distinguished himself among all the virtuosos of his generation by the beautiful sound which he drew from the piano without brutalizing the instrument and by applying only enough pressure on the keyboard to obtained a breadth of sound which belonged to him. He used the pedal with great art and tact and also knew how to oppose the happy contrasts of softness and grace to the powerful effects that he possessed better than any pianist. A favorite artist of lovers of brilliant music, concert and salon fantasies, his piano pieces were structured for the needs of the sale, almost improvised, but correctly written while praising the skill of the happy choice of patterns implemented and their variety. His concert and salon compositions have neither the merit of craftsmanship nor the ingenuity of the masters whom he had taken as influence but are unique on their own. 

Goria's first popular hits were his 1st. and 2nd. concert-études, in E-flat major, Opp. 7-8, his charming Bluette, which imitates Thalberg, from whom he obviously proceeds, as well as Prudent, but one thing must be said of those who imperfectly said he sounded pretentious and full of his own merit. This unfortunate appreciation is explained indeed by futile causes. Goria had neither the physiognomy of an Adonis nor the stretched features of the consumptive pianists. He was really at the opposite pole. His large size caused a natural reaction against the awkwardness of his cumbersome corpulence. A real shyness that he sought to disguise under an air of self-assurance whose exaggeration was just one more clumsiness.

Compositions with opus number
Note:The purpose of this list is to collect the prime date of publication of each composition and number them by year. They are categorized here by opus number (or WoO), and title, key, genre, and year in "sortable mode". By clicking the button on its respective cell all content in that column will be displayed in ascending or descending order creating so groups of compositions in relation to their key, musical form or date of publication. The notes section displays very useful and amusing information up to the point of establishing a connection among Goria's compositions, like that between Opp. 7-8-15-16-17-23-39 displayed in bone-colored opus numbers around  the stories that permeate them. His transcriptions show alabaster-colored titles while his scores are last displayed where much of the expected reference is impressed on paper.

Compositions without opus number

Additional information

Notes

Footnotes and scores

References

External links

Compositions by Alexandre Goria
Lists of compositions by composer
Lists of piano compositions by composer
Classical music catalogues